Events in the year 1963 in Belgium.

Incumbents
Monarch: Baudouin
Prime Minister: Théo Lefèvre

Events
 2 August – Division of Belgium into four linguistically defined territories comes into force.

Publications
 Hergé, Les Bijoux de la Castafiore album (serialised July 1961 to September 1962)

Births
 9 March – Yves Vander Cruysen, historian and local politician (died 2020)

Deaths
 30 May – Marthe Crick-Kuntziger (born 1891), museum curator

References

 
1960s in Belgium
Belgium
Years of the 20th century in Belgium
Belgium